FYA may refer to:
 Faya (duo), an English R&B duo formerly called FYA
 Flyant, a defunct Spanish airline operating 2006–2008
 The Foundation for Young Australians
 Saicus Air, a defunct Spanish airline operating 2008–2010
 Flashing Yellow Arrows, a traffic signal configuration that allows for permissive left-turns at a traffic signal while eliminating yellow traps
An abbreviation for "For Your Action", commonly used in business email communications